Gotfred Ingolf Kvifte (1914, Froland, Aust-Agder – 1997) was a Norwegian physicist.

He was born in Froland. He took the dr.philos. degree in 1953, and worked as a lecturer at the University of Bergen for one year. He was then a professor at the Norwegian College of Agriculture from 1954 to 1984. He served as rector there from 1961 to 1968.

References

1914 births
1997 deaths
People from Froland
Norwegian physicists
Academic staff of the Norwegian College of Agriculture
Rectors of the Norwegian University of Life Sciences